Riding the Midnight Train is the title of a recording by American folk music artists Doc Watson and Merle Watson, released in 1986. It is the last album Merle Watson recorded before he was killed in a tractor accident.

At the Grammy Awards of 1987, Riding the Midnight Train won the Grammy Award for Best Traditional Folk Album.

Guests include Béla Fleck, Sam Bush and Mark O'Connor.

Track listing
 "I'm Going Back to the Old Home" (Carter Stanley) – 2:11
 "Greenville Trestle High" (James Jett) – 3:25
 "Highway of Sorrow" (Bill Monroe, Pete Pyle) – 2:48
 "Fill My Way With Love" – 2:30
 "We'll Meet Again Sweetheart" (Lester Flatt, Earl Scruggs) – 2:48
 "Riding That Midnight Train" (Carter Stanley) – 2:04
 "Stone's Rag" (Traditional) – 3:20
 "Ramshackle Shack" (Wade Mainer) – 3:18
 "Midnight on the Stormy Deep" (Traditional) – 4:31
 "Baby Blue Eyes" (Jim Eanes) – 3:39
 "What Does the Deep Sea Say?" (Wade Mainer) – 3:31
 "Let the Church Roll On" (A. P. Carter) – 2:55
 "Sweet Heaven When I Die" (Claude Grant) – 2:07
Track 7 "Stone's Rag" omitted from Sugar Hill cassette tape SH-C-3752.

Personnel
Doc Watson – guitar, vocals
Merle Watson – guitar, banjo
T. Michael Coleman – bass, harmony vocals
Sam Bush – mandolin
Béla Fleck – banjo
Mark O'Connor – fiddle
Alan O'Bryant – guitar, harmony vocals
Production notes
Produced by Barry Poss
Engineered and remixed by Richard Adler
Photography by Will & Deni McIntyre
Remixing by Barry Poss, Richard Adler, T. Michael Coleman
Artwork by Raymond Simone

References

External links
 Doc Watson discography

1986 albums
Doc Watson albums
Sugar Hill Records albums